Johnson & Wales is a streetcar station in Charlotte, North Carolina. The at-grade island platform on West Trade Street is a stop along the CityLynx Gold Line, serving Johnson & Wales University and Gateway Village.

Location 
Johnson & Wales station is located on West Trade Street, between Clarkson and Cedar Streets, in Uptown Charlotte. Flanking the station is the Johnson & Wales Charlotte campus and Gateway Village office park. Also nearby is Elmwood Cemetery.

History 
Johnson & Wales Avenue station was approved as a Gold Line Phase 2 stop in 2013, with construction beginning in Fall 2016. Though it was slated to open in early-2020, various delays pushed out the opening till mid-2021. The station opened to the public on August 30, 2021.

Station layout 
The station consists of an island platform with two passenger shelters; a crosswalk and ramp provide platform access from West Trade Street. The station's passenger shelters house two art installations by Jim Hirschfield and Sonya Ishii.

References

External links
 

Lynx Gold Line stations
Railway stations in the United States opened in 2021
2021 establishments in North Carolina
Railway stations in North Carolina at university and college campuses
Johnson & Wales University